Josep Pesarrodona Altimi (born 1 February 1946 in Sant Salvador de Guardiola) is a former Spanish professional road bicycle racer who raced during the 1970s. Pesarrodona won the 1976 Vuelta a España ahead of Luis Ocaña and Jose Nazabal of Spain. Two years later at the 1978 Vuelta a España, he finished second to Bernard Hinault of France.

Major achievements 

1972
 8th Overall Vuelta a España
1973
 4th Overall Vuelta a España
 4th Overall Giro d'Italia
1976
 1st  Overall Vuelta a España
 1st 1 stage Tour de Suisse
1977
 8th Overall Vuelta a España
1978
 2nd Overall Vuelta a España

External links 

Official Tour de France results for José Pesarrodona

Spanish male cyclists
Vuelta a España winners
1946 births
Living people
People from Bages
Sportspeople from the Province of Barcelona
Tour de Suisse stage winners
Cyclists from Catalonia